Davis James Marshall Keillor-Dunn (born 2 November 1997) is an English professional footballer who plays as a midfielder for League Two club Mansfield Town.

Career

Ross County
Keillor-Dunn spent his youth career at Middlesbrough, Sunderland and Chesterfield before moving to Ross County on 22 July 2016. Whilst playing for the youth team in the 2016–17 season, he was one of the stand-out performers as they won their first Development League title. He was awarded a first team contract in summer 2017.

On 9 August 2017, he made his senior debut coming on as a substitute against Motherwell in the League Cup. On 9 September 2017, he made his first competitive start in the League against Partick Thistle, impressing in a 1–1 draw. On 14 October 2017, he scored his first goal for the club in the League against Hearts. He signed a new contract on 31 October 2017 after his initial break-through into the first team.

Keillor-Dunn moved on loan to Falkirk in January 2019. His first goal for Falkirk was against Queen of the South, where he was also sent off in the match. He left County by mutual consent in September 2019, after requesting more game time.

Wrexham
On 16 January 2020, Keillor-Dunn signed for Wrexham until the end of the 2019–20 season.

Oldham Athletic
On 7 October 2020, Keillor-Dunn signed for EFL League Two side Oldham Athletic on a one-year deal. He scored his first goal for Oldham on 10 November 2020 in an EFL Trophy group game against Bradford City. 

After scoring five goals in four consecutive matches as Oldham fought against relegation, Keillor-Dunn was awarded the EFL League Two Player of the Month award for February 2022. Following Oldham's relegation to the National League, Keillor-Dunn was released by the club at the end of the 2021–22 season.

Burton Albion
On 28 June 2022, League One club Burton Albion announced the agreement of a two-year deal with Keillor-Dunn. He scored six times in 26 appearances for Burton, including a first career hat-trick in a 4-4 draw at Accrington Stanley on 13 August 2022.

Mansfield Town
Kiellor-Dunn moved to League Two side Mansfield Town on 31 January 2023.

Career statistics

Honours
Individual
EFL League Two Player of the Month: February 2022
EFL League Two Goal of the Month

Notes

References

1997 births
Living people
English footballers
Footballers from Sunderland
Association football midfielders
Chesterfield F.C. players
Ross County F.C. players
Falkirk F.C. players
Wrexham A.F.C. players
Oldham Athletic A.F.C. players
Burton Albion F.C. players
Scottish Professional Football League players
National League (English football) players
English Football League players